The 1999 NCAA Women's Division I Swimming and Diving Championships were contested at the 18th annual NCAA-sanctioned swim meet to determine the team and individual national champions of Division I women's collegiate swimming and diving in the United States. 

This year's events were hosted at Gabrielsen Natatorium at the University of Georgia in Athens, Georgia. 

Hosts Georgia topped the team standings for the first time, finishing 63.5 points ahead of defending champion  Stanford, and claimed the Bulldogs' first women's team title.

Team standings
Note: Top 10 only
(H) = Hosts
(DC) = Defending champions
Full results

See also
List of college swimming and diving teams

References

NCAA Division I Swimming And Diving Championships
NCAA Division I Swimming And Diving Championships
NCAA Division I Women's Swimming and Diving Championships